Stenella gahniae is a species of anamorphic fungi.

References

External links

gahniae